Rubin Ludwig (c. 1920 – July 5, 1991) was a Canadian professional football player who played for the Calgary Stampeders and Winnipeg Blue Bombers. He played in 4 Grey Cups with Winnipeg in 1941 and 1945, winning in 1941. Also played with Calgary in 1947 and 1948. He again won the Grey Cup with the Stampeders in 1948. He previously played junior football in Winnipeg, Manitoba. He died after a long illness in 1991.

References

1920s births
1991 deaths
Canadian football people from Winnipeg
Players of Canadian football from Manitoba
Calgary Stampeders players
Winnipeg Blue Bombers players